The 2014 IIHF Inline Hockey World Championship Division I was an international inline hockey tournament run by the International Ice Hockey Federation. The Division I tournament ran alongside the 2014 IIHF Inline Hockey World Championship and took place between 1 and 7 June 2014 in Pardubice, Germany. The tournament was won by Slovenia who upon winning gained promotion to the 2015 IIHF Inline Hockey World Championship. While Brazil and Japan were relegated after finishing last and second last respectively.

Qualification
Three teams attempted to qualify for the one European spot remaining in the 2013 IIHF InLine Hockey World Championship Division I tournament, while Brazil automatically qualified for the Rest of the World spot as they were the only team who applied. The other six nations automatically qualified after their results from the 2013 World Championship and the 2013 Division I tournaments. The European qualification tournament was held in Passau, Germany with a place and was contested between Ireland, Latvia and Macedonia, with Lavia winning both of their games and earning a qualification spot.

 − Finished fourth in 2013 World Championship Division I
 − Finished second in 2013 World Championship Division I
 − Rest of the World Qualification
 − Finished fifth in 2013 World Championship Division I
 − Finished third in 2013 World Championship Division I
 − Finished sixth in 2013 World Championship Division I
 − Winner of the European Qualification
 − Relegated from the 2013 World Championship

European Qualification
The European Qualification tournament was held at the Eisarena in Passau, Germany from 9 August 2013 to 11 August 2013. Latvia gained promotion to Division I after winning both of their games and finishing first in the standings. Ireland finished in second place after winning their game against Macedonia.

All times are local.

Seeding and groups
The seeding in the preliminary round was based on the final standings at the 2012 IIHF InLine Hockey World Championship and 2012 IIHF InLine Hockey World Championship Division I. Division I's groups are named Group C and Group D while the 2013 IIHF InLine Hockey World Championship use Group A and Group B, as both tournaments are held in Pardubice, Czech Republic. The teams were grouped accordingly by seeding at the previous year's tournament (in parenthesis is the corresponding seeding):

Group C
 (9)
 (12)
 (13)
 (16)

Group D
 (10)
 (11)
 (14)
 (15)

Preliminary round
Eight participating teams were placed in the following two groups. After playing a round-robin, every team advanced to the Playoff round.

All times are local (UTC+2).

Group C

Group D

Playoff round
All eight teams advanced into the playoff round and were seeded into the quarterfinals according to their result in the preliminary round. The winning quarter finalists advanced through to the semifinals, while the losing teams moved through to the placement round. Japan and Brazil were relegated after losing their placement round games, while Austria finished fifth after defeating Brazil and Hungary finished sixth following their win over Japan. In the semifinals Australia defeated Croatia and Slovenia beat Latvia, both advancing to the gold medal game. After losing the semifinals Croatia and Latvia played off for the bronze medal with Croatia winning 4–3. Slovenia defeated Australia 10–5 in the gold medal game and earned promotion to the 2015 IIHF Inline Hockey World Championship.

All times are local (UTC+2).

Quarterfinals

Placement round

Semifinals

Bronze medal game

Gold medal game

Ranking and statistics

Final standings
The final standings of the tournament according to IIHF:

Tournament Awards
Best players selected by the directorate:
Best Goalkeeper:  Michael James
Best Defenseman:  Domen Vedlin
Best Forward:  Artjoms Ogorodnikovs

Scoring leaders
List shows the top skaters sorted by points, then goals. If the list exceeds 10 skaters because of a tie in points, all of the tied skaters are shown.

Leading goaltenders
Only the top five goaltenders, based on save percentage, who have played at least 40% of their team's minutes are included in this list.

References

External links
Division I at IIHF.com

IIHF InLine Hockey World Championship Division I
2014 in inline hockey
IIHF InLine Hockey World Championship
IIHF InLine Hockey World Championship Division I
Sports competitions in Pardubice
Inline hockey in the Czech Republic